Phuduhudu may refer to:
 Phuduhudu, a village in North-West District, Botswana
 Phuduhudu, a village in Kgalagadi District, Botswana